James Patrick Keane (January 11, 1924 – March 8, 2011) was a professional American football end in the National Football League (NFL). He played seven seasons for the Chicago Bears (1946–1951) and the Green Bay Packers (1952).

Keane, who was born in Bellaire, Ohio, remains the only player in Bears history to lead the team in receptions for four straight seasons, something he accomplished by catching a league-leading 64 passes in 1947, 30 in 1948, 47 in 1949 and 36 in 1950.

When he left the Bears following the 1951 season, Keane was the franchise’s all-time leader with 206 receptions and ranked second behind Ken Kavanaugh with 3,031 receiving yards.

Keane still holds the Bears record for most receptions in a game. He set the mark by catching 14 passes in a 35–28 road loss to the New York Giants on October 23, 1949.

Keane died in his city on March 8, 2011, in Lake Forest, Illinois, at the age of 87.

References

1924 births
2011 deaths
American football defensive ends
American football ends
Chicago Bears players
Great Lakes Navy Bluejackets football players
Green Bay Packers players
Iowa Hawkeyes football players
Northwestern Wildcats football players
People from Bellaire, Ohio
Sportspeople from Wheeling, West Virginia
Players of American football from Ohio